The Agency for Offices Administration of the Central Military Commission  is the chief organ under the Central Military Commission of the People's Republic of China. It was founded on January 11, 2016, under Xi Jinping's military reforms.

References

See also 

 Central Military Commission (China)
 State Administration of Government Offices

Central Military Commission (China)
2016 establishments in China